The list that follows was an unofficial shadow cabinet of the SNP led by Angus Robertson from 2015 to June 2017, after the Scottish National Party (SNP) became the third-largest party in the UK Parliament after the 2015 general election, and up until the defeat of Angus Robertson and other key SNP politicians in the 2017 general election. The Frontbench Team consisted exclusively of Members of the House of Commons, since the SNP has a policy of not appointing peers to the House of Lords.

Scottish National Party Frontbench Team

Westminster Group Leadership

Other Spokespeople

Whips Office

See also
Cabinet of the United Kingdom
Official Opposition Shadow Cabinet (UK)

Notes

References

External links
SNP Shadow Cabinet Appointments
SNP Shadow Cabinet reshuffle 
Parliament Appointments

Politics of the United Kingdom
2010s in the United Kingdom
2015 establishments in the United Kingdom
British shadow cabinets
2015 in British politics
Scottish National Party